Euphyes bayensis, the bay skipper, is a butterfly of the family Hesperiidae. It is found in coastal Mississippi in the United States.

The wingspan is 37–44 mm. Adults feed on flower nectar. The bay skipper is often confused with the Euphyes dion.

References

Butterflies described in 1989
Hesperiini